Karel Zlín, also known as Karel Machálek (born 23 July 1937 in Zlín) is a Czech painter, sculptor and poet.

After studying Applied Arts Secondary School in Uherské Hradiště he studied at Academy of Fine Arts in Prague under Vlastimil Rada and Karel Souček from 1957 to 1963. The following year, he began work, mostly paintings and illustrating books. He has designed dozens of movie posters.

Besides artistic activities, Zlín is also a noted poet; his first collection of poems was published in 1969. In recent years he has also translated the works of other authors.

In recent years, he has been inspired in his artwork from his trips to Egypt.

See also 

 List of Czech painters

References 

Czech painters
Czech male painters
Czech sculptors
Czech male sculptors
20th-century Czech poets
20th-century male writers
Czech male poets
1937 births
Living people
Writers from Zlín
Academy of Fine Arts, Prague alumni